Call Red is a British television action drama series created by J. C. Wilsher that premiered on 8 January 1996 on ITV. The series follows the adventures of an Air Ambulance squad, captained by Phillip Tulloch (Michael Carter). The series draws upon a documentary-style feel, including hand-held camera work for helicopter-based scenes, and detailed outlines of the procedures carried out by the medics themselves. Just a single series of seven episodes was produced. The complete series has been earmarked for release on DVD by Network Distributing, although no set date has been given for the release.

Early reception of the series was critical. Thomas Sutcliffe of The Independent said that the series is composed of "wooden acting" and "cardboard dialogue", and that "the wiser viewer will realise it shows no vital signs at all". Jim White of The Independent stated that "all the characters were ludicrously gung-ho, self-important and convinced they were the only people capable of administering medical assistance; typical doctors then, but not much fun to spend sixty minutes with".

Cast
 Michael Carter – Phillip Tulloch 
 Seamus Gubbins – Sean Brooks
 Allie Byrne – Alyson Butler
 Adam Levy – Sam Kline
 Claire Benedict – Jude Patton
 Maria McAteer – Kelly Wallace
 Ken Drury – Ross Murray
 Vincent Regan – Ray Sidley
 Kelle Spry – Clare Waddington
 Morgan Jones – Gary Moulton
 Charlie Caine – Terry Dukes

Episodes

Criticism
The series came under fire when aircraft equipment used in the filming of an episode which saw the team helping victims of a plane crash was returned to the owners severely damaged. It was claimed that the damage amounted to more than £48,000, and was caused when the production company, Thames Television, chose to light fires around fuselage and landing gear, which resulted in burning and corrosion of said equipment, and further damage was caused when the producers tried to extinguish the fires. The case was brought to court on 10 January 1996, just two days after the first episode premiered on ITV.

References

External links

1996 British television series debuts
1996 British television series endings
1990s British drama television series
ITV television dramas
1990s British television miniseries
Television series by Fremantle (company)
Television shows produced by Thames Television
English-language television shows
Television shows set in London